Jay Alvarrez is an American model, actor, and Internet personality. He has modeled for brands such as Calvin Klein, Armani, and Bonds. He has also appeared on the covers of GQ Style Russia and Esquire Greece, and he has also been featured in Inked magazine. He is a creator of video content mainly in extreme sports and travel.

Early life 
Alvarrez was born in Oahu, Hawaii on July 5, 1995. He was homeschooled by his mother until he lost her to cancer when he was 15 years old.

Career 
Alvarrez developed an online following after posting photos and videos of him participating in extreme sports including skydiving, surfing, and skating.

Alvarrez served as a model for Armani’s Fall 2016 ad campaign. In 2016, Alvarrez also began filming scenes for the comedy film Deported. He also signed a multi-picture deal with the film’s production company, Rebel Way Entertainment. Alvarrez also starred in the music videos for the songs “Carry Me” by Kygo and “Hey” by Fais feat. Afrojack.

In 2017, Alvarrez was photographed for Aldo’s Fall 2017 campaign. Alvarrez was also the face of Bonds Swim during its 2017 campaign. He was also photographed for British Vogue in 2017.

Alvarrez also served as a model for the CDLP’s 2018 swimwear campaign. He also collaborated with bag company DB Equipment (previously known as Douchebags) to release a line of backpacks called the Jay Alvarrez Collection.

He also became an ambassador for hemp-based apparel and accessories brand DRIHP in June 2020. Alvarrez appeared on the cover of GQ Style Russia’s September 2020 issue. Alvarrez also produced and starred in the music video for “Use Your Love” by Sam Feldt and The Him, which was released in October 2020. He also appeared on the cover of Esquire Greece in 2020.

Alvarrez became an ambassador for the “Breathe by Paka” line from Paka Apparel in 2021.

Alvarrez and his tattoos were photographed for Inked in 2022.

Other brands Alvarrez has modeled for include Coca-Cola, Omega Watches, and Hyundai.

Filmography

References 

Male models from Hawaii
1995 births
Living people